Is It Easy to Be Young? is a Soviet documentary film directed by Juris Podnieks. It was filmed in 1986 with dialogue in both Latvian and Russian, and is considered to be among the most controversial movies of its era. It was one of the five winners of the 1987 International Documentary Association awards.

The movie speaks about young people who perished as a result of growing up in Soviet society—their conflicts with parents and society, the patronizing attitudes of their teachers and the authorities, the fear that there is no meaning to their lives. Among the young people portrayed are high-schoolers looking for their place in life, a young mother worried about the future of her daughter after the Chernobyl catastrophe, a young man follower of the Hare Krishna movement (an 'unusual' religion that was discouraged even more than 'usual' ones by the Soviet government), as well young adults returning from compulsory military service in the Afghan War and having become ones of 'the lost generation'. The film's opening scene documents a concert by the banned Latvian rock band, Pērkons.

The movie had a major impact in the Soviet Union. It was seen by at least 28 million people during its first year. In all, 85 countries bought the rights to show the movie.

In 1986 the film received Latvian Film Prize for the best documentary. Its international debut was at the 1987 Kraków Film Festival, where it received the FIPRESCI Award. It was also screened out of competition at the 1987 Cannes Film Festival.

The film was re-released in 2007 by Jura Podnieka Studija; the new edition includes oral history interviews with Podnieks's colleagues.

After Latvia regained independence, Antra Cilinska filmed two sequels (Is It Easy to Be? in 1998, and Is it Easy? in 2010), featuring interviews with people filmed by Podnieks.

References

External links
 
 Jura Podnieka Studija

1987 films
Latvian documentary films
Soviet-era Latvian films
Soviet documentary films
Latvian-language films
Documentary films about children
Documentary films about the Soviet Union
Soviet teen films